The Fierce Five was the artistic gymnastics team that won the second team gold medal for the United States, and the first gold medal on international soil, in the women's team competition at the 2012 Summer Olympics in London. Originally referred to as the Fab Five, the five members of the team were Gabby Douglas, McKayla Maroney, Aly Raisman, Kyla Ross, and Jordyn Wieber. Later in the Olympic Games, Douglas won a gold medal in the individual all-around event, becoming the first African-American to ever do so; Maroney won silver on vault; Raisman, the team captain, won bronze on balance beam and gold on floor exercise.

Olympic Trials and team background

At the 2012 U.S. Olympic Trials, Douglas, Wieber, and Raisman finished first, second, and third respectively in the all-around competition. Maroney won the vault competition, Douglas and Ross tied for first on the uneven bars, while Raisman won the balance beam and floor exercise. Afterwards, Douglas, Maroney, Raisman, Ross, and Wieber were the five gymnasts chosen to represent the United States at the 2012 Summer Olympics. Douglas, nicknamed "the Flying Squirrel" for her skill on the uneven bars, finished first at the trials and was thus the automatic qualifier for the team.

The team members were all between the ages of 15 and 18. They were close to each other: Raisman and Wieber had been best friends, and Maroney and Ross had been best friends since they were young. All except Ross were on the U.S. team that won the team competition at the 2011 World Championships. Raisman, the oldest on the team at 18 years old, was elected team captain by the other members. The team's replacement athletes were Sarah Finnegan, Anna Li, and Elizabeth Price, but they were not used at the games.

The team was featured on the cover of Sports Illustrated'''s Olympic Preview issue; it was the first time since 1996 that a gymnast had appeared on the cover of Sports Illustrated.

Nickname
The US media originally dubbed the team the "Fab Five" before Olympic competition started.

Maroney and Wieber were credited for changing the team's nickname from the "Fab Five" to the "Fierce Five" a few days before their gold medal win at the Olympics. "I guess (Fab Five) was taken by some basketball team or something," Maroney said, referring to the five members of the Michigan college basketball team recruited in 1991. Jalen Rose, a former Michigan Fab Five member, complained about the gymnastics team being dubbed the Fab Five as well. "To use the nickname just points and screams of lazy journalism by the national media, that's really what it is," Rose said. "It's no fault at all of the young gymnasts. But I really wish they would have come up with an even more creative tag for them and their gold medal pursuit." Maroney and Wieber decided for that reason to "come up with an even more creative" name while on the bus to a training session. They reportedly started searching on their phones for words that started with F that described the team. The top choices were feisty and fierce. Maroney and Wieber opted for "fierce", as they said it described their floor routines, and the rest of the team concurred. Maroney also stated, "There have been Fab Fives in the past but I like Fierce Five because we are definitely the fiercest team out there."

Despite the name change, some news sources still used the term Fab Five during the Olympics."Fab 5: U.S. women claim gymnastics team gold". foxnews.com. July 31, 2012. Retrieved August 14, 2012. When the U.S. won the team competition, NBC announcer Al Trautwig proclaimed, "The Fab Five is going gold!"

2012 Summer Olympics

Qualifications
The United States qualified in first place with an overall score of 181.863. Wieber, Douglas, and Raisman competed on all four events. Ross competed on uneven bars, balance beam, and floor exercise. Maroney competed on vault. For the individual all-around competition, Raisman, Douglas, and Wieber qualified in second, third, and fourth place, respectively. Due to the rule allowing only the top two from each country to compete in a World or Olympic individual final, only Raisman and Douglas advanced. Wieber had won the all-around at the previous year's World Championships and was photographed in tears after the qualifications.

Team finals
Maroney, Douglas, and Wieber started off the team competition by performing the three highest-scoring vaults, giving the U.S. a lead that they would never relinquish. Douglas', Ross', and Wieber's scores combined for the third-highest score on uneven bars. Douglas, Raisman, and Ross kept the team in first with their performances on balance beam. Then, Raisman, Douglas, and Wieber clinched the gold medal by scoring first, third, and fourth highest on floor, respectively. The team finished with a score of 183.596, 5.066 points higher than second-place Russia; this was an "unheard-of" margin of victory. They became the second U.S. team, after the "Magnificent Seven" in 1996, to win the team competition.Keating, Steve. "Fierce Five trump Magnificent Seven". reuters.com. July 31, 2012. Retrieved August 14, 2012.

Individual all-around and event finals
In the individual all-around competition, Douglas won the gold medal, becoming the first African-American woman to win the event. She was also the first American gymnast ever to win both the team and individual all-around gold at the same Olympics. Raisman tied for the third-highest score with Russian Aliya Mustafina. A tie breaker was used to determine the bronze medalist, in which the highest combined execution score was awarded the tie. This led to Mustafina taking the bronze medal.

Maroney was the only American to qualify for the vault final. As the defending world champion in this event, she scored a 15.866 on her first vault but fell on her second, scored a 14.300, and won the silver medal. Her facial expression while standing on the podium became an internet meme.

The only American in the uneven bars final, Douglas, finished in eighth.

On the balance beam, Douglas finished in seventh. Raisman initially received a score of 14.966, which would have left her in fourth place. However, her coach inquired about the difficulty being too low, and the judges accepted and raised her difficulty score by one-tenth of a point. Her 15.066 matched Romanian Cătălina Ponor for third place, and this time, Raisman won the tie-breaker to earn the bronze medal.

In the floor final, Raisman won the gold medal with a score of 15.600, four-tenths ahead of the second-place Ponor. Raisman became the first American woman to win the gold medal on floor, and with her third medal overall, she was the most decorated member of the Fierce Five during the Olympics. Wieber finished seventh in the event.

Olympic scores

Team competition

Note 1: Wieber would have qualified for the all-around and Ross for the balance beam final, but they did not because only two athletes may represent each country in all-around and event finals.
Note 2: Although Wieber, Raisman, and Douglas all had top eight finishes on vault, none opted to do a second vault to qualify them for event finals.

Individual finals

Post-Olympics
In the week after the Olympic Games, the Fierce Five appeared on The Today Show and Late Show with David Letterman. They also rang the closing bell at the New York Stock Exchange. In September, they appeared at the MTV Video Music Awards. The Fierce Five members were among those who performed in the 40-city Kellogg's Tour of Gymnastics Champions, which started in September. In November, they met U.S. President Barack Obama at the White House and performed on Dancing with the Stars'' in support of former gymnast Shawn Johnson. In December, Gabby Douglas was named the Associated Press female athlete of the year. Aly Raisman was a contestant on Season 16 of Dancing with the Stars. The group was nominated for Best Team at the 2013 ESPY Awards, and Douglas and Raisman were also nominated for individual awards. In August 2013, the team was inducted into the USA Gymnastics Hall of Fame. At the 2013 World Artistic Gymnastics Championships, Maroney won a gold medal on vault, and Ross won silver medals on all-around, uneven bars, and balance beam.

All five women later came forward as survivors of Larry Nassar's systematic sexual abuse against US female gymnasts.

Gallery

See also

 Magnificent Seven, the U.S. 1996 Summer Olympics women's artistic gymnastics team
 Final Five, the U.S. 2016 Summer Olympics women's artistic gymnastics team

References

+
Nicknamed groups of Olympic competitors
+
Women's gymnastics
Women's sports in the United States
Gymnastics in the United States